Raphismia bispina is a species of dragonfly of the family Libellulidae, 
known as the spiny-chested percher. 
It is found in Malaysia, Philippines, Indonesia, New Guinea, and Australia. It is the only Australian species of Raphismia,
where it is found in mangrove swamps on Cape York, Queensland. It is a small dragonfly with metallic-black colouring which gets a pruinescent powder-blue coating when mature.

Gallery

See also
 List of Odonata species of Australia

References

Libellulidae
Odonata of Asia
Odonata of Australia
Insects of New Guinea
Insects of Indonesia
Insects of Southeast Asia
Taxa named by Hermann August Hagen
Insects described in 1867